Schifferstadt station is a separation station in the town of Schifferstadt in the German state of Rhineland-Palatinate, where the Speyer line branches off from the Mannheim–Saarbrücken railway.

History 
The station is on the first section of the Palatine Ludwig Railway (Mannheim–Saarbrücken railway), inaugurated between Neustadt and Ludwigshafen in 1847. The line from Speyer and Germersheim was opened in the same year. Since 12 March 1964, electric trains have run through Schifferstadt.

With the opening of the Rhine-Neckar S-Bahn, the station became a junction of the Rhine-Neckar network, with S-Bahn lines S1 and S2 (towards Kaiserslautern) and lines S3 and S4 (towards Germersheim) separating there. In the evenings Schifferstadt station is also a terminus of some S-Bahn trains.

Station facilities 
The station building houses a signal box, a ticket office and a kiosk. In the station area there are also telephone booths, bicycle parking, and a park and ride parking area. In addition the riot police (Bereitschaftspolizei) of  Rhineland-Palatinate are also established at the station. The station has an outside platform (platform 1) and a central platform (platform tracks 2 and 3).

Rail services
Schifferstadt station is served by only one regional transport service, the Regional-Express service (RE 4) from Karlsruhe to Mainz. The remaining local services are operated by the Rhine-Neckar S-Bahn. It was formerly served each day by a pair of intercity train (IC) services operate from Karlsruhe to Frankfurt and back, but these now run through without stopping.

Regional services

Rhine-Neckar S-Bahn

Notes

Further reading 
 
 
 
 
 

Railway stations in Rhineland-Palatinate
Rhine-Neckar S-Bahn stations
Railway stations in Germany opened in 1847
1847 establishments in Bavaria
Rhein-Pfalz-Kreis